The “Viadotto dell’Industria” (Industry viaduct), also known as "Bridge over the Basento" river or Musmeci Bridge, connects Potenza city centre exit on the Sicignano-Potenza motorway with the main access roads in the southern part of the city, which is in Italy.

Designed by the Italian engineer Sergio Musmeci in 1967, and built between 1971 and 1976, the bridge perfectly incarnates Musmeci's architectural theories. The structure cost about 920,000,000 Italian liras (equivalent to €4,000,000 in 2016).

The concrete sheet is shaped into a “finger-like” structure, which supports the whole bridge, and it is also used as a pedestrian walkway. Different studies performed an extended analysis and discussion on the actual structural form of the bridge over the Basento river. 

The bridge was built without using prefabricated elements, but only shuttering of concrete. Edilstrade Forlì-Castrocaro was the company that constructed the bridge.

Projects and planimetries are collected in the “Musmeci Sergio and Zanini Zenaide archive” which in 1997 was declared of great historical interest by the Archival superintendence of Lazio. Then in 2003, it was referred by the Ministry of Heritage and Culture as an example of architecture from the 20th century in the MAXXI (The National Museum of the 21st Century Arts, Rome). In 2003, the bridge was declared a “monument of cultural interest” by the Ministry of Heritage and Culture.

See also

References

External links 

Sergio Musmeci's funky concrete bridge
Concrete truth - Basento Bridge photo gallery

Bridges in Italy